Mercado Global is a 501(c)3 non-profit social enterprise organization that links indigenous artisans in rural Guatemalan communities to international sales opportunities, providing sustainable income-earning opportunities, access to business training and community-based education programs, and access to microloans for technology such as sewing machines and floor looms. Mercado Global's network includes over 300 artisans in thirty-one artisan cooperatives whose members have seen their daily income increase three-fold compared to the average Guatemalan daily wage. This has allowed them to send their children to school, and has resulted in significantly increased levels of saving and participation in household decision-making.

Mercado Global has offices in Brooklyn, NY and Panajachel, Guatemala.

Model
Mercado Global's partner artisans represent one of the world's most marginalized populations – rural indigenous women. Mercado Global provides donor-funded business education and leadership programs to help women become successful business owners. Women are then connected with large-scale sales opportunities so they can turn these skills into income. With this income, artisans provide nutritious food to their families and invest in their children's education — and the community breaks the cycle of poverty.

Mercado Global focuses on change from the ground up: it provides education, tools, and access to international markets so that women can build their own businesses and invest in their own communities. The partner artisans have suffered discrimination, violence, and extreme poverty. Through a dual approach that combines business partnerships with educational programs, Mercado Global connects women to international sales opportunities. Mercado Global partner artisans are rising to become leaders in their communities and a source of change in global sourcing practices.

Internships
As part of its mission to foster a sense of global responsibility among the next generation of leaders and consumers, Mercado Global accepts a limited number of students as interns at its offices in Guatemala and Brooklyn. The internship offers the opportunity to learn about the inner workings of a non-profit organization while becoming familiar with the growing fair trade industry.

Like many non-profit organizations, Mercado Global lists its internships on the interactive website idealist.org.

Awards
2007 Brick Award from the Do Something Foundation.
Executive Director Ruth DeGolia recognized as an "Architect of the Future" by Austria's Waldzell Institute for being an "exceptional emerging world leader and social entrepreneur" in September 2007.
DeGolia and co-founder Benita Singh featured on the cover of Newsweek magazine in honor of their selection as two of the "15 People Who Make America Great" on July 10, 2006.
Innovation in Social Enterprise Award from the Social Enterprise Alliance in April 2005.
DeGolia and Singh named among "the World's Best Emerging Social Entrepreneurs" by the Echoing Green Foundation in 2004.
Yale Entrepreneurial Society's Grand Prize at the Annual Business Plan Competition in 2004.

Notes

External links
Official Website

Mercado Global E-Commerce

Fair trade organizations
Organizations established in 2004
Development charities based in the United States
Charities based in New York City
Foreign charities operating in Guatemala